Matías Ezequiel Nizzo (born 2 February 1989) is an Argentine professional footballer who plays as a central midfielder for Independiente Chivilcoy

Career
Nizzo began his footballing career with Chacarita Juniors of Primera B Nacional. His first appearance for the club came on 4 April 2011 in a 1–1 draw with Belgrano, that was the first of thirty-one appearances in his opening two seasons with Chacarita in Primera B Nacional. At the end of 2011–12, Chacarita were relegated to Primera B Metropolitana. In the third tier, Nizzo played forty-two times over two seasons, 2012–13 and 2013–14, with the latter ending in promotion. On 28 July 2016, Nizzo joined Instituto on a one-year loan; a team he scored his first pro goal against in 2012. Instituto extended his loan in 2017.

Primera B Nacional side Deportivo Morón loaned Nizzo in June 2018. He scored one goal in forty-one matches in all competitions, having remained for two seasons. September 2020 saw Nizzo head abroad for the first time, as he agreed terms with newly-promoted Lorca Deportiva of Spain's Segunda División B. He suffered a serious ruptured achilles tendon injury in training in October, leaving him on the sidelines for four to six months.

Career statistics
.

References

External links

1989 births
Living people
Sportspeople from Buenos Aires Province
Argentine footballers
Association football midfielders
Argentine expatriate footballers
Expatriate footballers in Spain
Argentine expatriate sportspeople in Spain
Primera Nacional players
Primera B Metropolitana players
Argentine Primera División players
Chacarita Juniors footballers
Instituto footballers
Deportivo Morón footballers
CF Lorca Deportiva players
Club Sportivo Estudiantes players
Altos Hornos Zapla players